"Bad Girl" is the debut single South Korean boy group Beast, coming from their debut mini-album Beast is the B2ST which was released in South Korea on October 14, 2009.

The group released a Japanese version of the song as their second single in Japan on June 15, 2011.  The Japanese single came in 4 editions: 3 CD+DVD and a regular edition. On June 7, 2011, a week before the physical release, the song peaked at no. 1 in the mobile site Recochoku - Chaku Uta's daily ringtone chart. The single peaked at no. 2 in Oricon's Daily Chart with 21,449 copies sold on the first day and no. 3 in Oricon's Weekly Chart with 42,386 copies sold in the first week.

Background 

On May 19, 2011, while still in the midst of their Fiction and Fact promotions, Cube Entertainment announced that Beast will be releasing their second Japanese single on June 15, 2011 with a Japanese version of their debut song “Bad Girl”. The single was released in four editions: 3 limited CD + DVD edition (Type A comes with a 32-pages photobook, Type B and Type C) and a regular edition (comes with a trading card). Each edition of the single has a different B-side, all of which are remixes of their Korean songs aside from Easy (Sincere Version).

Promotions 

On June 14, 2011, Beast held a surprise event  at Tokyo, Shinjuku Station Square where they performed “Bad Girl (Japanese version)” and their debut single “Shock (Japanese Version) in front of approximately 5,000 fans. The event was held in order to promote the release of their second single which was set for release on the following day, June 15, 2011. However, Beast leader Yoon Doo Joon was not present in the event due to conflicting schedules. The group also held a two-day mini-concert titled Beast Night on June 22, 2011 at Studio Coast in Tokyo as a celebration for the release of their single. They also announced during this event that they'll be releasing their first regular Japanese album in August which would include their first two   releases.

Music video

Japanese version 
The Japanese version of the music video looks like the Korean version, the choreography is the same but it changes the studios (in total are 5 different studios) who are more clean and futuristic, the clothes are more fresh and clean and in the music video, the individual parts are in the same studio, different from the Korean version when every member has different studios. The music video was released in the YouTube official channel of the group in May 26, 2011. There were no dance break like the korean version.

Korean version

The music video was filmed in September 2009 and it premiered October 13, 2009.

The video begins with the members dancing in a black room, also it has blue lights (on the walls and ceiling), when it Kikwang's verse, the screen switches to the members where they dance in a white room, also there were solo scenes of the members, at 2:24 the song stops and the members do a dance break what were set in a brown night desert.

Track listing 
Japanese Single:

Charts

Oricon

Other charts

Release history

References

Cube Entertainment singles
2011 singles
Dance-pop songs
Japanese-language songs
Korean-language songs
Highlight (band) songs
2011 songs
Songs written by Shinsadong Tiger